Manchester Locomotive Works was a manufacturing company located in Manchester, New Hampshire, that built steam locomotives and fire engines in the 19th century. The first locomotive the company built was for the Chicago, Burlington and Quincy Railroad in March 1855.

Manchester purchased the locomotive manufacturing operation from the Amoskeag Locomotive Works in 1859. It acquired the steam fire engine business from Amoskeag Locomotive in 1876.

In 1901, Manchester and seven other locomotive manufacturing firms merged to form American Locomotive Company (ALCO). Locomotive production ceased in 1913.

Preserved Manchester locomotives 
The following locomotives (listed in serial number order) built by Manchester before the ALCO merger have been preserved. All locations are in the United States unless otherwise noted.

Notes 

Companies based in Manchester, New Hampshire
Emergency services equipment makers
Industrial buildings and structures in New Hampshire
Industrial buildings completed in 1855
Defunct locomotive manufacturers of the United States